Pisodonophis hijala is an eel in the family Ophichthidae (worm/snake eels). It was described by Francis Buchanan-Hamilton in 1822, originally under the genus Ophisurus. It is a marine, tropical eel which is known from the Indo-Pacific.

References

Ophichthidae
Fish described in 1822